Karpatiosorbus subcuneata, the Somerset whitebeam, is a species of plant in the family Rosaceae. It is endemic to coastal north Devon and west Somerset in the United Kingdom.  It is threatened by habitat loss.

Description
Its leaves are on average twice as long as broad. Fruits are distinctive – globose, reddish brown, and covered with silvery lenticels.

References

subcuneata
Endemic flora of England
Vulnerable plants
Taxonomy articles created by Polbot
Plants described in 1934
Taxobox binomials not recognized by IUCN